Anna Sergeyevna "Anne" Vyalitsyna (born 19 March 1986), also known as Anne V, is a Russian-American model best known for her 10-consecutive-year appearances (2005–2014) in the Sports Illustrated Swimsuit Issue.

Early life and discovery
Vyalitsyna was born in the Russian city of Gorky (now Nizhny Novgorod). Both of her parents are physicians. Her father is a sports doctor for an association football team and her mother is a pediatrician. Vyalitsyna started her professional modeling career at the age of 15 after IMG Models scouted saw her in Saint Petersburg while looking for new faces for MTV's Fashionably Loud Europe. She entered the contest and moved to New York after winning a contest sponsored by IMG and MTV. She became an American citizen on 16 November 2013.

Career
Within six months after winning the contest, Vyalitsyna worked for Anna Molinari, Chloé and Sportmax. She has appeared on the covers of Vogue, ELLE, and Glamour. She made her debut in the Sports Illustrated Swimsuit Issue in 2005 and has appeared in it each year until 2014.  She was the object/subject of Joanne Gair body painting works in the 2005 edition. 

She had an uncredited cameo in the fifth installment of the Die Hard film franchise, A Good Day to Die Hard.

In 2016, she walked for Versace SS 2017 fashion show along with Carmen Kass, Bette Franke, Adriana Lima, Naomi Campbell, Caroline Trentini, and Mariacarla Boscono.

Personal life
In 2009, Vyalitsyna completed the ING New York City Marathon. She volunteered to guide a disabled athlete through the race for Achilles International and tweeted about the race in real-time.

In 2011, Vyalitsyna dated Adam Levine, the lead singer of Maroon 5, and they appeared together on the November 2011 cover of Vogue Russia. She also appeared in the Maroon 5 music videos for Misery and Never Gonna Leave This Bed.  The couple broke up in April 2012. After she and Levine ended their relationship, she dated baseball player Matt Harvey for eight months from 2013 to 2014.

On 19 March 2015, Vyalitsyna announced that she was pregnant with her first child by boyfriend Adam Cahan. They welcomed daughter Alaska on 25 June 2015, stating that this name was chosen because Alaska is "where the U.S. and Russia meet". On 5 June 2016, Vyalitsyna and Cahan got engaged, but had separated by 2018.

Filmography

Film

Television

Web

Music videos

References

External links

2006 Sports Illustrated Swimsuit Gallery - Anne V
SI Swimsuit Collection Gallery - Anne V
The Age: "The Russians are coming"

Living people
Russian emigrants to the United States
1986 births
Russian female models
American female models
People from Nizhny Novgorod
Russian film actresses
American film actresses
21st-century American actresses
Participants in American reality television series
21st-century Russian actresses
People with acquired American citizenship
The Lions (agency) models
Elite Model Management models